The Berry Dress is a 1994 mixed media sculpture by Alice Maher.

Description
The sculpture has dimensions 25 x 32 x 24 centimeters. It is in the collection of The Irish Museum of Modern Art, Dublin.

Analysis
It represents a young girl's dress painted dark pink, that stands alone on a shelf. It is self-supported due to a wax treatment. The bottom part of the dress just under the yoke is decorated with rose hips, or berries. The dress was created in 1994 and the berries were originally round and a blood red color but have dried into a shriveled brown crust. The dress presents challenges for presentation and preservation, while being itself a commentary on the definition of the term "dress". 

Alice Maher's work often incorporates natural materials and this dress can be seen as a pendant of a similar girl's dress presented on a shelf covered in mummified honeybees.

When asked about her art, Maher said "...the meaning is changing all the time. This depends on the context, who's looking at it, and how much time has passed. For example with a dress, it meant something completely different perhaps in the 80s than now."

See also
 List of individual dresses

References

Sculptures in Ireland
1994 sculptures
Individual dresses
Pink dresses